Tim Willits is the former studio director, co-owner, and level designer of id Software, the American video game developer company. As of August 2019, Willits is the chief creative officer at Saber Interactive. He became a Director of 3D Realms with Saber Interactive’s acquisition of the company.

Biography
Willits is a computer science and business graduate of the University of Minnesota and a former member of the University of Minnesota Army ROTC program. Willits was the battalion cadet-command sergeant major (C/CSM) during his junior year and attended ROTC Advanced Camp at Fort Lewis, Washington during the summer between his junior and senior years of college.  After an injury during the summer, Willits completed two rotations, being assigned to both the first and seventh cadet regiments during that summer.  He held the rank of cadet-major (C/MAJ) during his senior year and was assigned as the battalion training officer.

Personal life
Married for the second time in 2009, Willits currently lives in a Dallas suburb with his wife, Alison Barron Willits. Together, both of them have triplets.

Career
Willits has stated in numerous interviews that he was inspired to make video games when he downloaded a shareware version of Doom. He played the first room of E1M1, thinking that was the entire demo, then, discovering a door that led the player to the other rooms. It was that moment when the door opened that Willits decided he wanted to make video games. He joined id Software in 1995 after impressing the owners and development team with Doom levels he forged in his spare time and distributed free over the Internet. Willits has worked on Strife, The Ultimate Doom, Quake, Quake II, Quake III Arena, Quake III: Team Arena and Doom 3.

Willits was lead designer on Doom 3, and executive producer on Quake 4.

He was the creative director on Rage and Quake Live.

Willits was referenced in the Doom movie as Dr. Willits.

Willits was the only id Software employee to attend every single QuakeCon event since its inception in 1996 until his departure from id in 2019, something of which he is proud. 

Willits was leading as game director on the arena shooter, Quake Champions.

On July 18, 2019, Willits announced he would leave id Software after serving for 24 years. He is now the chief creative officer at Saber Interactive.

Controversy
Willits received attention in August 2017 for claiming that he created the concept of multiplayer maps during the development of Quake. According to Willits, he approached coworkers John Romero and John Carmack with the idea of maps which could only be played in multiplayer, which Willits claimed the two dismissed as "the stupidest idea they'd ever heard". 

The following day, Romero refuted Willits' statement on his personal blog, claiming that Willits' alleged encounter between him and Carmack never happened. Carmack said that he does not recall the conversation between Tim Willits, John Romero, and himself, and he trusts Romero's recollection of events, in line with the account detailed on Romero's blog. Romero explained that many hundreds of deathmatch-only maps had been made for Doom prior to Quake's release, including a deathmatch map created by then-id Software employee American McGee. Romero also noted that Marathon and Rise of the Triad, first person shooters which predated Quake by over a year, both shipped with maps exclusive to multiplayer. Tom Hall, co-founder of id Software and director of Rise of the Triad, gave his support for Romero. Willits responded to the article by posting an early video of a map fragment with elements of Q1DM3 shown named Tim14.bsp on his Instagram, and stated that "I stand by what I said". In January 2020, Willits was on the Arcade Attack Podcast and clarifies that when he talked about multiplayer-only maps he was specifically talking about Quake, not FPS games in general. He also added that Quake was the first FPS game that had dedicated client-server architecture for multiplayer.

Willits was interviewed by Warren Spector in 2007, giving the same account of creating the concept of multiplayer-only maps. Willits also claimed to have created all of Quake's shareware levels; this was disputed by John Romero.

Works
These are the works Tim has done, which includes titles mostly from id Software:

Notes

References

External links
 Willits' profile from MobyGames
 E3 2007: id Into the Future interview from IGN

Living people
Video game designers
Creative directors
Id Software people
1971 births